Hopong ((() is a town in the Shan State of eastern Burma. Hopong is the capital of Pa'O Self-Administered Zone. It is located in Hopong Township in Taunggyi District.

Hopong has some locally known places, like Htam Sam Cave and Mway Taw Pagoda.

External links
Satellite map at Maplandia.com

Populated places in Shan State
Township capitals of Myanmar